The 1989 DFB-Supercup was the third DFB-Supercup, an annual football match contested by the winners of the previous season's Bundesliga and DFB-Pokal competitions.

The match was played at the Fritz-Walter-Stadion, Kaiserslautern, and contested by league champions Bayern Munich and cup winners Borussia Dortmund.

Teams

Match

Details

References

1989
FC Bayern Munich matches
Borussia Dortmund matches
1989–90 in German football cups